Tasiocera murina is a species of fly in the family Limoniidae. It is found in the  Palearctic .

References

External links
Images representing Tasiocera at BOLD

Limoniidae
Insects described in 1818
Diptera of Europe